Systellonotus is a genus of true bugs belonging to the family Miridae.

The species of this genus are found in Eurasia.

Species:
 Systellonotus albofasciatus (Lucas, 1849) 
 Systellonotus alpinus Frey-Gessner, 1871

References

Miridae